Natalia Vlaschenko (11 September 1960, Zhytomyr, Ukrainian SSR) is a Ukrainian journalist, theatrologist, screenwriter, television presenter, playwright, producer, columnist, publisher and contributing editor. She is the general producer of the Ukrainian TV-channel "ZIK", the ex-editor-in-chief of the Ukrainian socio-political magazine "Public people", and Honored Journalist of Ukraine.

She is the host of the political talk show "Narod proti", the programs "Pershi-drugi", "HARD with Vlaschenko" and the final talk show "Special project with Natasha Vlaschenko" on the "ZIK" TV-channel. Since 2018, she has been hosting the YouTube vlog "Vlast vs Vlaschenko".

She is included in the rating of the 100 most influential women in Ukraine by Focus magazine in 2017, 2018 and 2019.

She is a member of the Council for Freedom of Speech at the Office of the President of Ukraine.

Biography 
Natalia Vlaschenko was born in Zhytomyr, Ukraine.

She graduated from the faculty of Philology of Zhytomyr I. Franko Pedagogical University (faculty of philology) and Kiev National I. K. Karpenko-Kary Theatre, Cinema and Television University (Faculty of Theatre Studies).

Career 

Natasha Vlaschenko worked as a correspondent for the theatre arts department of the Ukrainian newspaper "Culture and Life". She was also the first deputy editor-in-chief of the Ukrainian newspaper "Segodnya".

In 1999, she founded the publishing house "Flyleaf", which publishes popular Ukrainian magazines "Public people", "Persons of Ukraine", as well as books of the "PL" library.

In 2011, she co-authored the book "Animal Dialogues" with Yevhen Minko. The authors jokingly told about the peculiarities of Ukrainian society and media.

In 2014–2017, Vlaschenko worked on the TV channel "112 Ukraine".

In March 2016, she became the winner of the XX anniversary national program "Person of the year-2015" in the category "TV journalist of the year" in Ukraine.

In February 2017, Vlaschenko became the creative producer of the Ukrainian TV channel "ZIK" and presented the book “Theft, or White Sun of Crimea”. In August, she became the general producer of the Ukrainian TV channel "ZIK".

In 2017 and 2018, she was included in the rating of the 100 most influential women in Ukraine by Focus magazine and was awarded the Ukrainian Woman of the "Third Millennium Award" in the "Rating" section.

In 2019, she is again included in the rating of the 100 most influential women in Ukraine, according Focus magazine, and in November 2019, Vlaschenko became the Member of the council for freedom of speech and protection of journalists at the Office of the President of Ukraine Volodymyr Zelensky.

Books 
 Yevhen Minko, Natasha Vlaschenko. "Animal Dialogues". Kyiv: Flyleaf. 2011. 120 pages. 
 Garik Korogodskyi, Natasha Vlaschenko. "We Had Sex". Kharkiv: Folio. 2015 319 pages. 
 Natasha Vlaschenko. "Theft, or White Sun of Crimea". Kharkiv: Folio. 2017. 400 pages. 
 Natasha Vlaschenko. "Under the Sky of Austerlitz". Kharkiv: Folio. 2018.
 Natasha Vlaschenko. “His Guard's Girlfriend”. Laurus. 2019.
 Natasha Vlaschenko co-authored with her granddaughter Irina Vlaschenko. Children's adventure story “The Girl and the Dinosaur”. Summit-book. 2019

Family 
 Husband — Leonid, who is a businessman.
 Son — Sergey, a political strategist.

References

External links 
 
 
 Natalia Vlaschenko on YouTube

Living people
1960 births
Writers from Zhytomyr
Ukrainian journalists
Ukrainian women journalists
Ukrainian screenwriters
Ukrainian television presenters
Ukrainian women television presenters
Ukrainian producers
21st-century Ukrainian writers
Ukrainian YouTubers
21st-century screenwriters